Chiulikam is a populated place situated in Maricopa County, Arizona, United States. It has numerous other unofficial names by which it is known, which include: Chiuli, Salcilla, Sauceda Well, Suwuki Vaya, Tschiulikam, and Vokivaxia.

References

Populated places in Maricopa County, Arizona